Stevenson Bluff is a bluff 4 nautical miles (7 km) northwest of Mount Ellery in Wilson Hills. The bluff forms a portion of the divide between the Manna and Suvorov Glaciers. Mapped by United States Geological Survey (USGS) from surveys and U.S. Navy air photos, 1960–63. Named by Advisory Committee on Antarctic Names (US-ACAN) for William P. Stevenson, Aviation Machinist's Mate of U.S. Navy Squadron VX-6, a helicopter crew-member at McMurdo Station during 1968.

Cliffs of Oates Land